The Smiling Terror is a 1929 American silent Western film directed by Joseph Levigard and written by George H. Plympton and Carl Krusada. The film stars Ted Wells, Derelys Perdue, Al Ferguson and Bud Osborne. The film was released on June 30, 1929, by Universal Pictures.

Plot

Cast     
 Ted Wells as Ted Wayne
 Derelys Perdue as Mabel
 Al Ferguson as Hank Sims
 Bud Osborne as Ned

References

External links
 

1929 films
1929 Western (genre) films
Universal Pictures films
American black-and-white films
Silent American Western (genre) films
Films with screenplays by George H. Plympton
1920s English-language films
1920s American films